Alloptychites is an extinct genus of cephalopods belonging to the ammonite subclass.

References 

Ceratitida genera